Dijana Radojević (born 2 April 1990) is a Serbian handball player for CS Măgura Cisnădie and the Serbian national team.

Achievements
Serbian Cup :
Winner: 2014
 The best player of the tournament Serbian Cup 2014
Women's Regional Handball League :
Final Four (3rd place): 2012

References

External links

1990 births
Living people
Serbian female handball players
Sportspeople from Jagodina
Universiade medalists in handball
Expatriate handball players in Turkey
Serbian expatriate sportspeople in France
Serbian expatriate sportspeople in Iceland
Serbian expatriate sportspeople in Turkey
Universiade bronze medalists for Serbia
Medalists at the 2015 Summer Universiade
Selfoss women's handball players
Yenimahalle Bld. SK (women's handball) players
Mediterranean Games competitors for Serbia
Competitors at the 2009 Mediterranean Games
21st-century Serbian women